Lieutenant General George Peach Taylor Jr. USAF (Ret.) (born 1953) was the 18th Surgeon General of the United States Air Force, Headquarters U.S. Air Force, Washington, D.C. General Taylor served as the senior Air Force officer responsible for comprehensive management of the Air Force Medical Service. In this capacity, he advises the Secretary of the Air Force and Air Force Chief of Staff, as well as the Assistant Secretary of Defense for Health Affairs, on matters pertaining to the medical aspects of the air expeditionary force and the health care of 2.6 million Air Force beneficiaries. The Surgeon General has authority to commit resources for the Air Force Medical Service, to make decisions affecting the delivery of medical services, and to develop plans, programs and procedures to support worldwide medical service missions. The Surgeon General exercises direction, guidance and technical management of more than 42,000 people assigned to 74 medical treatment facilities worldwide. From September 7, 2010 – December 22, 2010 he served as the acting Assistant Secretary of Defense for Health Affairs

General Taylor was born in Birmingham, Alabama and graduated from Rice University with degrees in physics and Russian language. He was commissioned a second lieutenant in the Air Force Reserve through the Health Professions Scholarship Program. Following his graduation from Baylor College of Medicine in Houston, Texas, and subsequent internship in Greenville, South Carolina, General Taylor entered active duty in 1979.

General Taylor was a chief flight surgeon and board certified in aerospace medicine by the American Board of Preventive Medicine. He served as a flight surgeon in a series of flight test and fighter assignments and was the commander of the Air Force hospital at Hill Air Force Base, Utah. General Taylor was the Command Surgeon with U.S. Air Forces in Europe at Ramstein Air Base, Germany, where he served as the TRICARE Regional Director for Europe for one year. In addition, he was the Air Force Surgeon during operations Allied Force and Shining Hope in the Balkans. He served as the Command Surgeon for Air Combat Command where he molded the Air Force medical support for the response to the attacks of September 11, 2001, and for Operation Noble Eagle and Operation Enduring Freedom. General Taylor chaired the medical portion of the 2005 Base Realignment and Closure process, which resulted in the creation of a new Walter Reed National Military Medical Center, a new San Antonio military medical system, a joint medical education and training complex, and joint biomedical research centers.

Education
1975 Bachelor of Arts degree in physics and Russian language, Rice University, Houston, Texas
1978 Doctor of medicine, Baylor College of Medicine, Houston, Texas
1984 Master's degree in public health, Harvard School of Public Health, Boston, Massachusetts
1985 Residency in aerospace medicine, U.S. Air Force School of Aerospace Medicine, Brooks AFB, Texas
1993 National War College, Fort Lesley J. McNair, Washington, D.C.

Assignments
October 1979 – March 1981, Chief of Flight Medicine, U.S. Air Force Clinic, and Squadron Flight Surgeon, 67th Tactical Fighter Squadron, Kadena AB, Japan
April 1981 – August 1983, Chief of Aerospace Medicine, Detachment 3, Air Force Flight Test Center, Henderson, Nevada
September 1983 – June 1984, student, Harvard School of Public Health, Boston, Massachusetts
July 1984 – June 1985, resident, U.S. Air Force School of Aerospace Medicine, Brooks AFB, Texas
July 1985 – June 1988, Chief of Aerospace Medicine and Commander of the Air Transportable Hospital, U.S. Air Force Hospital, Torrejon AB, Spain
July 1988 – June 1990, medical inspector of active-duty forces, Air Force Inspection and Safety Center, Norton AFB, California
June 1990 – July 1992, Chief of Aerospace Medicine, U.S. Air Force Hospital, Air Force Flight Test Center, Edwards Air Force Base, California
August 1992 – June 1993, student, National War College, Fort Lesley J. McNair, Washington, D.C.
July 1993 – April 1995, Commander and Director of Base Medical Services, 75th Medical Group, Ogden Air Logistics Center, Hill AFB, Utah
May 1995 – June 1996, Chief, Aerospace Medicine Division, later, Deputy Director, Air Force Medical Operations Agency, Bolling AFB, Washington, D.C.
June 1996 – June 1997, Associate Director, later, Director of Medical Programs and Resources, Office of the Surgeon General, Bolling AFB, Washington, D.C.
June 1997 – July 2000, Command Surgeon, U.S. Air Forces in Europe, Ramstein AB, Germany
July 2000 – January 2002, Command Surgeon, Headquarters Air Combat Command, Langley AFB, Va.
January 2002 – June 2002, Assistant Surgeon General for Expeditionary Operations, Science and Technology, Office of the Surgeon General, Bolling AFB, Washington, D.C.
July 2002 – September 2002, Special Assistant to the Surgeon General of the Air Force, Office of the Surgeon General, Bolling AFB, Washington, D.C.
October 2002 – October 2006, Surgeon General of the Air Force, Headquarters U.S. Air Force, Washington, D.C.

Flight information
Rating: Chief flight surgeon
Flight hours: More than 1,600
Aircraft: F-15D, F-16B/D, C-5, C-12, C-21, C-130, C-141, KC-135, T-37, T-38 and T-39

Major awards and decorations
  Air Force Distinguished Service Medal with oak leaf cluster
  Defense Superior Service Medal
  Legion of Merit with oak leaf cluster
  Meritorious Service Medal with four oak leaf clusters
  Air Force Commendation Medal
  Air Force Achievement Medal
  Air Force Recognition Ribbon
  Gold Cross of Honor of the Bundeswehr (Germany)

Other achievements
Malcolm C. Grow Award for Air Force's Flight Surgeon of the Year
Fellow, American College of Preventive Medicine
Medical license: Texas
Fellow and former council member, Aerospace Medical Association
Former President, American Society of Aerospace Medicine Specialists
Former President, Society of U.S. Air Force Flight Surgeons
Air Force delegate, American Medical Association
Lifetime member and Founders Medal Recipient, Association of Military Surgeons of the United States
Chairman, Joint Medical Cross Service Group – Base Realignment and Closure (2002–2005)
Distinguished Professor of Military/Emergency Medicine, Uniformed Services University of the Health Sciences
Distinguished Alumni Award, Rice University, 2007

Effective dates of promotion
Second Lieutenant 1975
First Lieutenant 1977
Captain July 2, 1979
Major June 5, 1984
Lieutenant Colonel September 30, 1989
Colonel May 31, 1994
Brigadier General April 1, 2000
Major General July 1, 2002
Lieutenant General December 1, 2002

References

Living people
Surgeons General of the United States Air Force
Recipients of the Legion of Merit
Physicians from Birmingham, Alabama
Rice University alumni
Baylor College of Medicine alumni
Harvard School of Public Health alumni
Recipients of the Air Force Distinguished Service Medal
1953 births
Recipients of the Defense Superior Service Medal
United States Assistant Secretaries of Defense